Sir Thomas Fetherston, 2nd Baronet (1759 – 19 July 1819), alias Fetherstonhaugh, was an Anglo-Irish politician.

Fetherston was the son of Sir Ralph Fetherston, 1st Baronet and succeeded to his title in 1780. He sat in the Irish House of Commons as the Member of Parliament for St Johnstown between 1783 and 1790, and then represented Longford County from 1796 to 1800. He subsequently sat for Longford in the House of Commons of the United Kingdom between 1801 and his death in 1819. He was succeeded in his title by his son, George Ralph Fetherston.

References

1759 births
1819 deaths
18th-century Anglo-Irish people
19th-century Anglo-Irish people
Irish MPs 1783–1790
Irish MPs 1790–1797
Irish MPs 1798–1800
Baronets in the Baronetage of Ireland
Members of the Parliament of Ireland (pre-1801) for County Longford constituencies
Members of the Parliament of the United Kingdom for County Longford constituencies (1801–1922)
UK MPs 1801–1802
UK MPs 1802–1806
UK MPs 1806–1807
UK MPs 1807–1812
UK MPs 1812–1818
UK MPs 1818–1820